Irandhir Santos Pinto (born 22 August 1978) is a Brazilian actor.

Early life
Born in Barreiros, Pernambuco, Irandhir lived in several cities in the countryside of Pernambuco during his childhood. In 2003, he graduated in performing arts degree course at the Federal University of Pernambuco. Since then, he acted in some plays, a television mini-series and several movies.

Filmography

Film

Television

References

External links
 

1978 births
Brazilian male film actors
Brazilian male television actors
Federal University of Pernambuco alumni
Brazilian gay actors
Living people
People from Pernambuco